Red Letter Day is a Canadian satirical horror feature film, released in 2019. The film follows what happens in an isolated suburban community when the entire neighborhood receives red letters instructing them to kill one of their neighbors before their neighbor kills them. The film was released in North America by Epic Pictures Group under their DREAD label  on Blu-ray and VOD in November 2019.

Plot 
The story of the film features a recently divorced mother and her two teenage children who, while adjusting to a new life in the suburban community of Aspen Ridge, receive mysterious letters instructing them to kill the people in their letters before they kill them. Paranoia and chaos ensue as the family attempts to rationally deal with the irrational situation.

Reception
The film was a hit on the international genre film festival circuit with screenings at London FrightFest Film Festival, Screamfest Horror Film Festival, Fantaspoa, Brussels International Fantastic Film Festival and more. The film received positive critical attention, including Screen Anarchy saying "It plays like a modern mash-up of David Cronenberg's Shivers (film) and Kinji Fukasaku's Battle Royale (film)." and renown English journalist Kim Newman saying "A terrific premise, ferociously well worked out, and an excellent performance from Dawn Van de Schoot as an unwilling tiger mommy.".

References

External links

Red Letter Day Official Website

2019 films
2010s satirical films
Canadian horror films
Canadian satirical films
English-language Canadian films
Films shot in Alberta
Films set in Alberta
2010s English-language films
2010s Canadian films